Neal Bell is an American playwright and screenwriter. Bell has written such plays as the thriller Two Small Bodies, as well as co-writing the screenplay for the Two Small Bodies film adaptation.

Bell has written other plays such as On the Bum, Somewhere in the Pacific, Monster, Operation Midnight Climax, Therese Raquin and Spatter Pattern (Or, How I Got Away With It).

References

External links

Broadwayworld.com
Theaterstudies.duke.edu

American dramatists and playwrights
American male screenwriters
American male dramatists and playwrights